Killer Creek is a creek in the Moira River and Lake Ontario drainage basins in Addington Highlands, Lennox and Addington County, Ontario, Canada.

Course
The Skootamatta River flows via the Moira River to the Bay of Quinte on Lake Ontario at Belleville.

See also
List of rivers of Ontario

References

Rivers of Lennox and Addington County